Maurizio Rocha is a Bolivian retired football (soccer) midfielder who played professionally in Major League Soccer and USL A-League.

Youth
Rocha graduated from Saint Benedict's Preparatory School, which he had attended through St. Benedict's foreign exchange program with the Tahuichi Academy in Bolivia. Rocha attended the University of Connecticut, playing on the men's soccer team from 1995 to 1998. He was a 1998 First Team All American.

Professional
In February 1999, Rocha signed the Major League Soccer Project 40 and was assigned to the Miami Fusion. He spent the 1999 season with Project 40. In 2000, he played eleven games with the Fusion first team. The Fusion waived Rocha on November 2, 2000. In 2003, he played for the Rochester Rhinos and El Paso Patriots of the USL A-League.  In April 2004, he signed with the Western Mass Pioneers, but was released in July.  Rocha also played for Real Santa Cruz in Bolivia.

References

External links
 MLS: Maurizio Rocha

1976 births
Living people
Sportspeople from Santa Cruz de la Sierra
Bolivian footballers
Bolivian expatriate footballers
UConn Huskies men's soccer players
El Paso Patriots players
Major League Soccer players
Miami Fusion players
Rochester New York FC players
A-League (1995–2004) players
Western Mass Pioneers players
MLS Pro-40 players
Expatriate soccer players in the United States
Bolivian expatriate sportspeople in the United States
All-American men's college soccer players
Association football midfielders